The Postal Service are an American indie pop supergroup from Seattle, Washington, consisting of singer Ben Gibbard, producer Jimmy Tamborello, and Jenny Lewis on background vocals.

The band released their only album, Give Up, in 2003 on Sub Pop Records, to mostly positive reviews. The album reached number 114 on the US Billboard 200 album chart and received platinum certification from the Recording Industry Association of America.

The Postal Service remained largely inactive from 2005 until 2013, when they reunited for a tour and released a re-issue of Give Up to celebrate its tenth anniversary. Laura Burhenn joined the lineup throughout the tour to provide additional vocals and instruments, with Jen Wood and Jenny Lewis filling in for a few shows.

History

Formation (2001–2003)
The group formed after Ben Gibbard contributed vocals for a song by Jimmy Tamborello called "(This Is) The Dream of Evan and Chan", from the Dntel album Life Is Full of Possibilities. Ben Gibbard became familiar with Tamborello's work after a serendipitous meeting at a Flobots concert in Spokane, WA. The song sparked an EP of remixes of other artists, such as Lali Puna, The Flaming Lips, Safety Scissors, Barbara Morgenstern and Superpitcher, and was so well-received that the two artists decided to further collaborate. The third member of the band, Jenny Lewis, recorded vocals for several tracks before eventually becoming a full-fledged member of the band, sharing vocals and instrumentation in their live shows.

The band's name was chosen due to how it produced its songs. Due to conflicting schedules, Tamborello wrote and performed instrumental tracks and then sent the DATs through the United States Postal Service to Gibbard, who then edited the song as he saw fit (adding his vocals along the way) and sent them back to Tamborello.

Give Up (2003–2007)
The band's debut album, Give Up, was released on February 18, 2003, on Sub Pop Records. Several songs on the album feature guest vocals from Lewis, as well as vocals from indie rock musician Jen Wood. Additionally, Gibbard's Death Cab for Cutie bandmate Chris Walla played the guitar and piano on several tracks. Although both Gibbard and Tamborello's main projects were still active at the time, The Postal Service supported the album with a successful concert tour and stated its intention to tour again in the future.

Give Up received gold certification by the Recording Industry Association of America in March 2005, and later receiving platinum certification in October 2012. The album was Sub Pop's most successful release after Nirvana's debut album, Bleach.

The album produced three singles, the most well-known single being "Such Great Heights", which was released as Give Up'''s lead single. The song featured in advertisements for UPS, Kaiser Permanente, and M&M's, as well as being the first theme song for ABC's Grey's Anatomy in 2005. A cover of the song by Iron & Wine was featured on the soundtrack for the 2004 film Garden State. It was also later covered by Amanda Palmer, Ben Folds, The Scene Aesthetic, Brack Cantrell, Streetlight Manifesto, Confide, Gareth Pearson, Joy Kills Sorrow and Postmodern Jukebox. Confide would later release a music video for their cover of "Such Great Heights". The second single, "The District Sleeps Alone Tonight", was featured in the soundtrack of the 2004 film D.E.B.S. and later covered by British singer-songwriter Frank Turner. The third and final single, "We Will Become Silhouettes", was covered by The Shins, and the original version was featured in the trailer for the movie Funny People.

United States Postal Service controversy
In August 2003, the United States Postal Service sent the band a cease and desist letter, citing the band's name as an infringement of its trademark on the phrase "postal service".  After negotiations, the USPS relented, allowing the band use of the trademark in exchange for promotional efforts on behalf of the USPS and a performance at its annual National Executive Conference. Additionally, at one point the USPS website sold the band's CDs. In 2007, "Such Great Heights" appeared in the background of the "whiteboard" advertising campaign for one of the federal establishment's private competitors, the United Parcel Service.

Possible second album (2007–2012)
On June 22, 2007, it was revealed that The Postal Service had begun work on a new album, though the specifics of the production and the release date were vague.  Gibbard stated, "We're slowly starting. We're crawling right now, and whether that crawl turns into a walk remains to be seen. But we'll know more towards the end of the year. I've just been touring so much and trying to find time to make it happen and make our schedules line up." Tamborello added, "We're talking about wanting to finish an album by sometime next year, because we have to work with Death Cab's schedule and stuff. I definitely want to do another one."

On February 29, 2008, Spinner released an article stating that The Postal Service might not release a new album. Ben Gibbard stated, "Jimmy and I are still throwing ideas back and forth, but as time goes on, we find ourselves busy with our own music. ... We have some stuff, but it's been difficult to find the time and the drive to do the record. I'd love to finish it at some point and maybe even do some performances. If it's meant to be, it's meant to be." In May 2008, Gibbard stated that he and Tamborello were unlikely to release another album "before the end of the decade."

In a December 2008 interview with Rolling Stone, Gibbard laughed off suggestions that The Postal Service's long overdue follow-up to their 2003 hit Give Up would be an indie version of the Guns N' Roses album Chinese Democracy, which took 15 years to produce and release. Gibbard said that both he and Tamborello do not see it as a priority in light of their main projects, Death Cab for Cutie and Dntel, respectively. He said, "The anticipation of the second record has been a far bigger deal for everybody except the two of us... I don't know about it being the indie-rock Chinese Democracy, but now that Chinese Democracy has come out, I guess it just becomes the second Postal Service record that will never come out. There never really was a plan to do a second album. We work from time to time together but we have other things that take up all of our time."

In November 2012, Ben Gibbard posted on his Twitter account that there are "no plans" to produce another Postal Service record, and did not cite any specific reason for this statement, other than the fact that multiple fans questioned if there was going to be a second album.

Reunion, Give Up re-issue, and disbandment (2013–2014)
In January 2013, The Postal Service updated its website to read "The Postal Service 2013", reigniting speculation that the band would play shows, or possibly release a new album. It was later confirmed that the image on the band's site portended that the band's debut, Give Up, would receive a 10th-anniversary re-issue featuring a 15-song disc of rarities, including two new songs with Jenny Lewis to be released on April 9, 2013. The following month, The Postal Service announced it would officially reunite for an extended world tour with venues including Red Rocks Amphitheatre, the 2013 Coachella Valley Music and Arts Festival in April, Sasquatch! Music Festival in Washington in May, the Primavera Sound Festival 2013 in Barcelona, and Free Press Summer Fest in Houston, Texas in June.

Along with the reunion, the band released their first new track in ten years called "A Tattered Line of String" featuring Jenny Lewis. On March 21, the band released a second new track titled "Turn Around", released through 107.7 The End.

As a tie-in to the Give Up reissue, comedy website Funny or Die posted a parody video directed by Tom Scharpling set in 2002 titled "The Postal Service Auditions", in which Jimmy Tamborello holds auditions for his musical collaborator. Guest stars on the video include "Weird Al" Yankovic, Moby, Duff McKagan, Tom DeLonge, Aimee Mann, Jon Wurster, Page Hamilton, Nate Mendel, and Marc Maron.

On August 3, 2013, Ben Gibbard announced on Twitter that the Lollapalooza after-show would be the last Postal Service performance ever, and that the band would formally disband permanently after the show, finally quashing rumors of a highly anticipated second album. The band played their last live show at the Metro Chicago on August 5, 2013.

As an end punctuation mark to their career, The Postal Service released the feature-length documentary concert film Everything Will Change on October 7, 2014, filmed during their two performances at the Greek Theater in Berkeley, CA, July 26–27, 2013. Directed by Justin Mitchell, the film intersperses backstage tapes and interviews with complete footage of the concert itself.

Subsequent collaborations and releases
Jimmy Tamborello produced a remix of Death Cab for Cutie's 2018 song "Summer Years".

Jenny Lewis toured with Death Cab for Cutie in the summer of 2019, in support of their On the Line and Thank You for Today albums, respectively.  On select dates, Gibbard invited Lewis to join DCFC for their set's encore, and DCFC played "Nothing Better", with Gibbard and Lewis doing the vocals from the original song.

Ben Gibbard performed "Such Great Heights" solo on August 17, 2020, online for the virtual 2020 Democratic National Convention.

On October 6, 2020, The Postal Service created new social media accounts for the band and teased an announcement for the following day, sparking speculation about new music. The announcement was a mock video conference featuring Gibbard, Tamborello, and Lewis along with several musicians and celebrities urging people in the United States to vote in the November election, done in the style of 2013's "The Postal Service Auditions".

On December 4, 2020, The Postal Service released the live album Everything Will Change via Sub Pop Records, featuring the complete live recordings from the documentary/concert film released in 2014, remastered and available in audio format for the first time. Live tracks "Natural Anthem" and "The District Sleeps Alone Tonight" from the album were released as digital singles on November 22, 2020.

The Postal Service will reunite again in 2023 for a co-headlining tour with Death Cab for Cutie, performing Give Up'' in its entirety to celebrate the 20th anniversary of the album.

Members
 Benjamin Gibbard – lead vocals, guitar, bass, keyboards, drums (2001–2005, 2013, 2023)
 Jimmy Tamborello – production, keyboards, electronic percussion, programming, accordion (2001–2005, 2013, 2023)
 Jenny Lewis – backing and lead vocals, guitar, sampling (2002–2005, 2013, 2023)

Touring musicians
 Laura Burhenn – keyboards, backing vocals (2013)
 Barrett Martin – drums, electronic percussion (2013)

Discography

Studio albums

Live albums

Singles

Other appearances

Music videos
 "A Tattered Line of String"
 "The District Sleeps Alone Tonight"
 "Such Great Heights"
 "We Will Become Silhouettes"

Remix work

Notes

References

External links

The Postal Service page at Sub Pop Records

 
Electronic music duos
Electronic music groups from Washington (state)
Indie pop groups from Washington (state)
Indie rock musical groups from Washington (state)
Musical groups established in 2001
Musical groups disestablished in 2005
Musical groups reestablished in 2013
Musical groups disestablished in 2013
Musical groups from Seattle
Remixers
Rock music supergroups
Sub Pop artists
2001 establishments in Washington (state)